Rabia Kazan (born 25 June 1976) is a Turkish author and women's rights activist of Persian ancestry. She is the president of the Middle Eastern Women's Coalition (MEWC) and was formerly on the board of directors of the National Diversity Coalition for Trump (NDC TRUMP). Kazan is a former Muslim and a critic of Islam, known for her bestselling book The Angels of Tehran about the legal prostitution system in Iran.

Career 
Kazan started her journalism career in 1996 as a television correspondent working on the show Istanbul Documentary on the Turkish channel Flash TV. She then became a columnist for the Nationalist Movement Party (MHP) affiliated with the Turkish newspaper Ortadoğu where she worked for six years. She became widely-known in Turkey for conducting an interview with Mehmet Ali Ağca while working at Ortadoğu as an investigative journalist. She also founded news magazine Haber Revizyon in İstanbul.

In 2007, Kazan went to Iran undercover, where she witnessed child marriages, human trafficking, and wedleases. She interviewed approximately 200 women. When Kazan returned to her country she published her book Tahran Melekleri (The Angels of Tehran), which was about Nikah mut‘ah, a temporary Muslim marriage. Her book became a bestseller in Turkey. After her work and publication of her books, she received multiple death threats. 

She visited many Middle Eastern countries in dedication to her work to save women across the Middle Eastern from Sharia law by recording information taken from the women she met and work with.

She actively promoted Secularism in Islam to prevent of child marriages and the human trafficking of women on various media platforms in Italy.

Kazan moved to the US in 2010 and worked for World Federation of United Nations Associations at the United Nations for two years.

In 2012 she began working as a writer and women's rights activist at the International Civil Liberties Alliance (ICLA).

Kazan launched a global campaign in 2014 named This Is Not My Allah against Islamic Terrorism with French political analyst Alain Wagner in New York City. The aim of the campaign is to encourage Muslims to speak out against Islamic extremism.

Political involvement 
In 2015, Kazan endorsed Donald Trump because of his statements about radical Islam. In 2016, she joined the National Diversity Coalition for Trump (NDC TRUMP) as an executive. In 2016, Kazan gave an interview to CNN News in which she approved of Trump's approach to Islamic extremism and encouraged moderate Muslims to stand up against radical Islam. In 2018 she became a president of the Middle Eastern Women's Coalition, a pro-Trump group Kazan formed. Kazan also donated to Trump's campaign, which, as a foreign national, was illegal for her to do.

Kazan later denounced many of her pro-Trump colleagues, believing they used her as a token minority to make Trump's comments on Islam less incendiary. She said that she herself had been "brainwashed".

Personal life 
In 2008, Kazan married Giacinto Licursi, an Italian lawyer and politician, and later moved to Rome. 

She made a decision to remove her hijab in 2012, which she had been forced to wear from age seven.

Kazan has converted to Christianity.

See also
 List of Donald Trump presidential campaign endorsements, 2016
 List of women's rights activists

References

1976 births
Living people
People from Malatya
Former Muslim critics of Islam
Turkish former Muslims
Turkish nationalists
Turkish women activists
Turkish women journalists
Turkish women writers
Turkish women's rights activists